Palestine participated in the 2011 Asian Winter Games in Almaty and Astana, Kazakhstan from January 30, 2011, to February 6, 2011.

Alpine skiing

Palestine will send 2 alpine skiers.

Men

Women

References

Nations at the 2011 Asian Winter Games
Asian Winter Games
Palestine at the Asian Winter Games